Ponta de São Lourenço (Portuguese for the "Point of Saint Lawrence") is the easternmost point of the island of Madeira. It is inside the town of Caniçal and forms a part of the municipality of Machico.  Its terrain are made up of rocks and herbaceous vegetation. Since 1982, the headland is a nature reserve, where it has the conservation of its endemic plants including Matthiola maderensis, Echium nervosum, and Andryala glandulosa, and it has fauna, including birds, insects, and molluscs. One of them is Monachus monachus, a seal. Marine fauna are in the waters surrounding the headland.

Northeast of the islet is Porto Santo, and southeast is Bugio and the Deserted Islands. Nearby are a few islets with the easternmost being Ilhéu do Farol (Farol Islet), where its nearby lighthouse is located.

The headland's highest point is Pico do Furado. There is a path which takes about an hour to walk from the headland entrance. To the west is the New Port of Madeira.

The headland's geology consists of pyroclastic rocks as well as basalt dykes (dikes) and some coasts being eroded. The group dates back to the Late Pleistocene, about 100,000 years ago.

Important Bird Area
Ponta de São Lourenço, along with the islets of Ilhéuda Cevada and Ilhéu do Farol at the eastern end, have been recognised as an Important Bird Area (IBA) by BirdLife International for their seabird colonies, including the largest Caspian gull colony in Madeira.

References

External links

Geography of Madeira
Machico
Natura 2000 in Portugal
Important Bird Areas of Madeira